Vaasa is a Finnish constituency represented in eduskunta. It covers the administrative regions of Ostrobothnia, Central Ostrobothnia and Southern Ostrobothnia. Vaasa currently elects 16 members to eduskunta.

The constituency is largely rural, and particularly the coastal areas around the city of Vaasa are largely Swedish-speaking. The largest party in the 2007 election was the Centre Party.

Members of Parliament 2019–2023 
Anna-Maja Henriksson
Joakim Strand
Mikko Ollikainen
Anders Norrback
Pasi Kivisaari
Mika Lintilä
Mikko Savola
Antti Kurvinen
Mauri Peltokangas
Juha Mäenpää
Jukka Mäkynen

Current members of parliament 2007–
 Esko Ahonen (Kesk.)
 Anna-Maja Henriksson (SFP)
 Bjarne Kallis (KD)
 Miapetra Kumpula-Natri (SDP)
 Mika Lintilä (Kesk.)
 Juha Mieto (Kesk.)
 Håkan Nordman (SFP)
 Mats Nylund (SFP)
 Petri Pihlajaniemi (Kok.)
 Tuomo Puumala (Kesk.)
 Paula Risikko (Kok.)
 Petri Salo (Kok.)
 Paula Sihto (Kesk.)
 Jutta Urpilainen (SDP)
 Raimo Vistbacka (PS)
 Ulla-Maj Wideroos (SFP)
 KD = Christian Democrats
 Kesk. = Centre
 Kok. = National Coalition
 PS = True Finns
 SFP = Swedish People's Party
 SDP = Social Democrats

Election results

|}

See also
 Constituencies of Finland